Tama is an extinct indigenous Tucanoan language of Colombia. It was spoken in the regions of Vicente, Orteguaza River and Caquetá Region.

References

Languages of Colombia
Extinct languages of South America
Tucanoan languages